Ten Things I Wish I'd Known Before I Went Out into the Real World is a book by Maria Shriver, published in 2000. It evolved from her commencement address at College of the Holy Cross, during which she said "Ten Things I Wish Someone had told me at Graduation Before I Went Out in the World". They are elaborated in her book (listed as the titles of its chapters):

 First and Foremost: Pinpoint Your Passion
 No Job Is Beneath You
 Who You Work for and with Is as Important as What You Do
 Your Behavior Has Consequences
 Be Willing to Fail
 Superwoman is Dead (and Superman may be taking Viagra)
 Children Do Change Your Career (Not to Mention Your Entire Life)
 Marriage is a Hell of a Lot of Hard Work
 Don't Expect Anyone Else to Support You Financially
 Laughter

Reception 
Publishers Weekly reviewed the book, writing, "In lessons that are mostly about work and character, she shares simple notions that are fundamentally sound and that many adults will agree with: pursue your passion; consider no job to be beneath you; be willing to fail; realize that behavior has consequences; find a mentor. Unfortunately, the warmth and humor Shriver may have projected in person are forced on the page".

References 

2000 non-fiction books
Self-help books
American non-fiction books
Personal development
Shriver family
Kennedy family